Acontias jappi, Japp's burrowing skink, is a species of lizard in the family Scincidae. It is found in western Zambia and eastern Angola.

References

Acontias
Skinks of Africa
Reptiles of Angola
Reptiles of Zambia
Reptiles described in 1968
Taxa named by Donald George Broadley